The demographic history of Palestine refers to the study of the historical population of the region of Palestine, which approximately corresponds to modern Israel and the Palestinian territories.

Iron Age

A study by Yigal Shiloh of The Hebrew University suggests that the population of Palestine in the Iron Age could have never exceeded one million. He writes: "... the population of the country in the Roman-Byzantine period greatly exceeded that in the Iron Age..." Shiloh accepted Israeli archaeologist Magen Broshi's estimates of Palestine's population at 1,000,000-1,250,000 and noted that Iron Age Israel's population must have been less considering population growth. "...If we accept Broshi's population estimates, which appear to be confirmed by the results of recent research, it follows that the estimates for the population during the Iron Age must be set at a lower figure."

One study of population growth from 1,000 BCE to 750 BCE estimated the Jewish population of Palestine (Judah and Israel) had an average natural growth of 0.4 per cent per annum.

Persian period

Both the Babylonian conquest and the period of Achaemenid rule witnessed notable drops in the population of Jerusalem, the Shephelah and the Negev region, while a continuity is maintained in the northern Judean and Benjamin areas. As early as the fall of Judah, a substantial Edomite population is attested in southern Judah. When the kingdom of Edom itself succumbed, those people continued its traditions in the south, which the Arabic-speaking Qedarites controlled. Along the coastal region the Phoenician presence expanded, while the Cisjordan underwent demographic change with the inflow of Moabite and Ammonite refugees, while the southern part of Judea underwent substantive change with the settlement of Edomites. The exilic returnees resettled, perhaps with a heightened sense of their ethnic identity.

Hellenic and Hasmonean period

The Achaemenid Empire was conquered by Alexander the Great in the 330s BC. By this time, an administrative unit (ὕπαρχεία) called Idumea, which appears to link the Iron Age kingdom of Edom with the area west of the Dead Sea, extended over the Arad and Beersheba valleys, the southern Shephelah and the southern Judean hills  In 160 BCE the continuing Hellenisation of Palestine led to the Maccabean revolt. The composition of the population, from the end of the Hasmonean dynasty had a large preponderance of Jewish elements compared to strictly localized Greek (pagan) centres, together with a dominant Samaritan enclave in Samaria.

Roman and Byzantine period

The Roman conquest of Judea led by Pompey took place in 63 BC. The Roman occupation encompassed the end of Jewish independence in Judea, the last years of the Hasmonean kingdom, the Herodian age and the rise of Christianity, the First Jewish–Roman War, and the fall of Jerusalem and the destruction of the Second Temple. The total population of Pharisees, the forerunners of modern Rabbinic Judaism, was around 6,000 ("exakischilioi"), according to Josephus.
Local population displacements occurred with the expulsion of the Jews from Jerusalem – "In the earlier revolt in the previous century, 66–73 CE, Rome destroyed the Temple and forbade Jews to live in the remaining parts of Jerusalem; for this reason, the Rabbis gathered instead on the Mediterranean coast in Yavneh near Jaffa". Dispersal to other parts of the Roman Empire occurred: 
"No date or origin can be assigned to the numerous settlements eventually known in the west, and some may have been founded as a result of the dispersal of Palestinian Jews after the revolts of AD 66–70 and 132-5, but it is reasonable to conjecture that many, such as the settlement in Puteoli attested in 4 BC, went back to the late republic or early empire and originated in voluntary emigration and the lure of trade and commerce."

Modern estimates vary: Applebaum argues that in the Herodian kingdom, there were 1.5 million Jews, a figure Ben David says covers the numbers in Judea alone. Salo Wittmayer Baron estimated the population at 2.3 million at the time of Roman emperor Claudius (reigned 41–54).  According to Israeli archeologist Magen Broshi, west of the Jordan River the population did not exceed 1 million: 
"... the population of Palestine in antiquity did not exceed a million persons. It can also be shown, moreover, that this was more or less the size of the population in the peak period – the late Byzantine period, around AD 600" 
Broshi made calculations based on the grain-producing capacity of Palestine and on its role in the indigenous diet, assuming an average annual per-capita consumption of 200 kg. (with a maximum of 250 kg.), which would work out to the limit of a sustainable population of 1,000,000 people, a figure which, Broshi states, remained roughly constant down to the end of the  Byzantine period (600 CE).  The proportion of Jews to gentiles is also unknown.

Three events caused the Jewish population dominance to change after AD 70 (in the Late Roman period). The first was the rise of Christianity. The second involved the Jewish Diasporas resulting from a series of Jewish rebellions against the Roman occupation, starting in AD 66 which resulted in the destruction of the Second Temple and of Jerusalem in AD 70 to the subsequent expulsion of the Jews from Jerusalem, and followed by the rebellion against Hadrian in AD 132 – the Bar Kokhba revolt.

The Bar Kokhba revolt in the 2nd century saw a major shift in the population of Palestine. The sheer scale and scope of the overall destruction, according to a late epitome of Dio Cassius's Roman History, where he states that Roman war operations in the country had left some 580,000 Jews dead, with many more dying of hunger and disease, while 50 of their most important outposts and 985 of their most famous villages were razed to the ground. "Thus," writes Dio Cassius, "nearly the whole of Judaea was made desolate." It would take many years before the Judaean Jewish community recovered from the Bar Kochba war, seeing that for nearly 1850 years Jews no longer formed the majority in Palestine.

The third event was the 'ascension' of Constantine the Great in 312 and Christianity becoming the official state religion of Rome in 391. Already by the mid-3rd century the Jewish majority had been reported to have been lost, while others conclude that a Jewish majority lasted much longer – "What does seem clear is a different kind of change – immigration of Christians and the conversion of pagans, Samaritans, and Jews eventually produced a Christian majority".
After the Bar Kokhba revolt of 132-136 CE the make-up of the population of Palestine remains in doubt due to the sparsity of data in the historical record. Figures vary considerably as to the demographics of Palestine in the Christian era.
No reliable data exist on the population of Palestine in the pre-Muslim period, either in absolute terms or in terms of shares of total population. Although many Jews were killed, expelled or sold off into slavery after the AD 66–70 and the 123–125 rebellions, the degree to which these transfers affected the Jewish dominance in Palestine is rarely addressed. What is certain is that Palestine did not lose its Jewish component. Goldblatt concludes that the Jews may have remained a majority into the 3rd century AD and even beyond. He notes that 'Jewish followers of Jesus' (Jewish Christians) would not have taken part in the rebellions'. Non-Christian conversions from Judaism after the Bar Kochba revolt were not given much attention. 
"Indeed, many must have reacted to the catastrophe with despair and total abandonment of Judaism. Apostates from Judaism (aside from converts to Christianity) received little notice in antiquity from either Jewish or non-Jewish writers, but ambitious individuals are known to have turned pagan before the war, and it stands to reason that many more did so after its disastrous conclusion. It is impossible to determine the number who joined the budding Christian movement and the number who disappeared into the polytheist majority."

The highest population of the 3rd to 7th centuries probably occurred in the Byzantine period. Most scholars consider that the proportion of Jews decreased during these centuries, a loss of dominance not related to any specific diaspora and at dates not agreed to by historians. For instance, by counting settlements, Avi-Yonah estimated that Jews comprised half the population of the Galilee at the end of the 3rd century, and a quarter in the other parts of the country, but had declined to 10–15% of the total by 614. On the other hand, by counting churches and synagogues, Tsafrir estimated the Jewish fraction at 25% in the Byzantine period.  Stemberger, however, considers that Jews were the largest population group at the beginning of the 4th century, closely followed by the pagans. In contrast to Avi-Yonah, Schiffman estimated that Christians only became the majority of the country's population at the beginning of the 5th century, confirmed by DellaPergola who estimates that by the 5th century Christians were in the majority and Jews were a minority.

Middle Ages

The Christian-majority population of Byzantine Palestine, having been formed by conversions plus various migrations, was to undergo yet another upheaval. In 629 Palestine was invaded by Arabs from the Hejaz. By 635 AD, Palestine, Jordan and Southern Syria, with the exception of Jerusalem and Caesarea, were in Muslim hands. Jerusalem capitulated in 637.

Unlike the Byzantine era which saw forced conversions of Jews and Samaritans to Christianity, Levy-Rubin advocated that conversion was not commonplace during the early period of the Islamic empire (the Umayyad Caliphate [661 – 750] and the Abbasid Caliphate [750 – 1258]) – "It has been presumed until now that [the presence of Muslims in Samaria] was solely a result of immigration of Arab Muslims into the area. ... a small part of this Muslim population originated in Samarian population which converted to Islam during the early Muslim period mainly as a result of difficult economic conditions for non-Muslims. As of now, this is the only evidence we have of mass conversion to Islam in Palestine during the early Muslim period.". Arabization of the Levant involved the realm's new subjects adopting the Arabic language and Islam.

"Very few Arabs were productive settlers of the land, an activity they despised; a few were great landlords who used native tenants to cultivate their estates; but generally they were nomadic tribesmen, soldiers and officials all of whom lived off the jizya (or poll tax) and the kharaj (or land tax) paid by the occupied peoples in return for the protection of their lives and property and for the right to practice their own religion. Because the jizya and the kharaj could be imposed only on non-Muslims, the Arabs had little interest in making converts to Islam, a contributory reason why Syria, Palestine and Egypt would remain overwhelmingly Christian for centuries to come."

According to Amitai and Ellenblum the Islamization of Palestine had its beginnings in the early Islamic period (ca. 640–1099 C.E.), but had halted and apparently even been reversed during the time of Frankish rule (Kingdom of Jerusalem). In the aftermath of the Muslim reconquest, which began in 1187, and the advent of Ayyubid rule (1187–1260) in parts of Palestine and then the Mamluk rule, it appears that the process of religious conversion was accelerated. With the beginning of the Ottoman period in 1516, it is commonly assumed, and may well be that the Muslim majority in the country was more-or-less like that of the mid-19th century.

Early Ottoman period 

During the first century of the Ottoman rule, i.e., 1550, Bernard Lewis in a study of Ottoman registers of the early Ottoman Rule of Palestine reports:
From the mass of detail in the registers, it is possible to extract something like a general picture of the economic life of the country in that period. Out of a total population of about 300,000 souls, between a fifth and a quarter lived in the six towns of Jerusalem, Gaza, Safed, Nablus, Ramle, and Hebron. The remainder consisted mainly of peasants, living in villages of varying size, and engaged in agriculture. Their main food-crops were wheat and barley in that order, supplemented by leguminous pulses, olives, fruit, and vegetables. In and around most of the towns there was a considerable number of vineyards, orchards, and vegetable gardens.

Late Ottoman period

In the late nineteenth century, prior to the rise of Zionism, Jews are thought to have comprised between 2% to 5% of the population of Palestine, although the precise population is not known.

Jewish immigration had begun following the 1839 Tanzimat reforms; between 1840 and 1880, the Jewish population of Palestine rose from 9,000 to 23,000.

According to Alexander Scholch, Palestine in 1850 had about 350,000 inhabitants, 30% of whom lived in 13 towns; roughly 85% were Muslims, 11% were Christians and 4% Jews.

The Ottoman census of 1878 indicated the following demographics for the three districts that best approximated what later became Mandatory Palestine; that is, the Mutasarrifate of Jerusalem, the Nablus Sanjak, and the Acre Sanjak. In addition, some scholars estimate approximately 5,000-10,000 additional foreign-born Jews at this time:

According to Ottoman statistics studied by Justin McCarthy, the population of Palestine in the early 19th century was 350,000, in 1860 it was 411,000 and in 1900 about 600,000 of which 94% were Arabs.

The estimated 24,000 Jews in Palestine in 1882 represented just 0.3% of the world's Jewish population. Per McCarthy's estimate, in 1914 Palestine had a population of 657,000 Muslim Arabs, 81,000 Christian Arabs, and 59,000 Jews. McCarthy estimates the non-Jewish population of Palestine at 452,789 in 1882, 737,389 in 1914, 725,507 in 1922, 880,746 in 1931 and 1,339,763 in 1946.

Based on the work of Roberto Bachi, Sergio Della Pergola estimated that Palestine's population in 1914 was 689,000, comprising 525,000 Muslims, 94,000 Jews, and 70,000 Christians.

According to another estimate, the Jewish population in 1914 was 85,000 and subsequently fell to 56,000 in 1916–1919 as a result of World War I. During the war, the Ottoman authorities deported many Jews with foreign citizenship, while others left after they were presented with a choice of taking Ottoman citizenship or leaving Palestine. By December 1915 about 14% of the Jewish population had left, mainly for Egypt, where they awaited the war's end so they could return to Palestine.

According to Dr. Mutaz M. Qafisheh, the number of people who held Ottoman citizenship prior to the British Mandate in 1922 was just over 729,873, of which 7,143 were Jews. Qafisheh calculated this using population and immigration statistics from the 1946 Survey of Palestine, as well as the fact that 37,997 people acquired provisional Palestinian naturalization certificates in September 1922 for the purpose of voting in the legislative election, of which all but 100 were Jews.

British Mandate era

Official reports
In 1920, the British Government's Interim Report on the Civil Administration of Palestine stated that there were hardly 700,000 people living in Palestine:

There are now in the whole of Palestine hardly 700,000 people, a population much less than that of the province of Gallilee alone in the time of Christ. Of these 235,000 live in the larger towns, 465,000 in the smaller towns and villages. Four-fifths of the whole population are Moslems. A small proportion of these are Bedouin Arabs; the remainder, although they speak Arabic and are termed Arabs, are largely of mixed race. Some 77,000 of the population are Christians, in large majority belonging to the Orthodox Church, and speaking Arabic. The minority are members of the Latin or of the Uniate Greek Catholic Church, or—a small number—are Protestants.

The Jewish element of the population numbers 76,000. Almost all have entered Palestine during the last 40 years. Prior to 1850 there were in the country only a handful of Jews. In the following 30 years a few hundreds came to Palestine. Most of them were animated by religious motives; they came to pray and to die in the Holy Land, and to be buried in its soil. After the persecutions in Russia forty years ago, the movement of the Jews to Palestine assumed larger proportions. Jewish agricultural colonies were founded. They developed the culture of oranges and gave importance to the Jaffa orange trade. They cultivated the vine, and manufactured and exported wine. They drained swamps. They planted eucalyptus trees. They practised, with modern methods, all the processes of agriculture. There are at the present time 64 of these settlements, large and small, with a population of some 15,000.

By 1948, the population had risen to 1,900,000, of whom 68% were Arabs, and 32% were Jews (UNSCOP report, including Bedouin).

Report and general abstract of the Jewish agriculture was taken by the Palestine Zionist Executive in April 1927.

 Object of the Census:

(p 85) Demography: to enumerate all Jewish inhabitants living in the agricultural and semi-agricultural communities.

(p 86) Number of Settlements: 130 places have been enumerated. If we consider the large settlements and the adjacent territories as one geographical unit, then we may group these places into 101 agricultural settlements,  3 semi-agricultural places  (Affule, Shekhunath Borukhov and Neve Yaaqov) and 12 farms scattered throughout the country.  In addition, there were a few places which, owing to technical difficulties, were not enumerated in the month of April. (Peqiin, Meiron, Mizpa and Zikhron David, numbering in the aggregate 100 persons).

Of these agricultural settlements, 32 are located in Judea, 12 in the Plain of Sharon, 32 are located in the Plain of Jesreel, 16 in Lower Galilee, and 9 in Upper Galilee. Most of them have a very small population - about one half being inhabited by less than 100 persons each. In 42 settlements there are from 100 to 500 persons, and in only five does the population exceed 1.000. viz.

(p 86) Number of Inhabitants: The aggregate population living in the agricultural and semi-agricultural places were 30.500.

 
Length of Residence in Palestine

(p 87 & p 98)The pre-war population accounts for 9,473 persons, which is slightly less than one-third of the present population, whereas the rest are post-war immigrants. Some 10.000 persons settled since 1924, since the so-called middle-class immigration.

Late Arab and Muslim immigration to Palestine

Whether there was significant Arab immigration into Palestine during the 19th and 20th centuries, especially after the beginning of Zionist settlement there in the late 19th century has become a matter of some controversy. It is known that the Arab population of Palestine doubled during the British Mandate era, from 670,000 in 1922 to over 1.2 million in 1948, and there has been considerable debate over the subject on how much of this growth was due to natural increase, as opposed to immigration. Estimates on the scope of Arab immigration to Palestine during this period vary.

Ottoman period, 1800–1918

Some Egyptian migration to Palestine happened at the end of the 18th century due to a severe famine in Egypt, and several waves of Egyptian immigrants came even earlier to escape natural disasters such as droughts and plagues, government oppression, taxes, and military conscription. Although many Palestinian Arabs also moved to Egypt, Egyptian immigration to Palestine was more dominant. In the 19th century, large numbers of Egyptians fled to Palestine to escape the military conscription and forced labor projects in the Nile Delta under Muhammad Ali. Following the First Egyptian-Ottoman War, which saw the Egyptian conquest of Palestine, more Egyptians were brought to Palestine as forced laborers. Following the Second Egyptian-Ottoman War, which saw Egyptian rule in Palestine terminated, massive numbers of soldiers deserted during the Egyptian army's retreat from Palestine to permanently settle there. Egyptians settled mainly in Jaffa, the Coastal plain, Samaria and in Wadi Ara. In the southern plain there were 19 villages with Egyptian populations, while in Jaffa there were some 500 Egyptian families with a population of over 2,000 people. The largest rural concentration of Egyptian immigrants was in the Sharon region. According to David Grossman, statistics show the number of Egyptian immigrants to Palestine between 1829 and 1841 exceeded 15,000, and he estimated that it was at least 23,000 and possibly up to 30,000. According to Grossman, an even larger number of Egyptians migrated to Palestine between the late 19th century and 1948, with the number of Egyptians increasing substantially after 1882. Palestine also accommodated numerous waves of Algerian immigration between the French conquest in 1830 and 1920. In 1860, there was significant immigration to Safed by Moorish (i.e. Arab-Berber) tribes from Algeria and a small number of Kurds, while some 6,000 Arabs from the Beni Sakhr tribe immigrated to Palestine from what is now Jordan to settle in Tiberias. In addition, considerable numbers of Turks stationed in Palestine to garrison the land settled there.

Some Bosnian Muslims migrated to Palestine in 1864. In 1878, following Austro-Hungarian occupation of Bosnia and Herzegovina, many Bosnian Muslims, apprehensive of living under Christian rule, emigrated to the Ottoman Empire, and significant numbers went to Palestine, where most adopted the surname Bushnak. Bosnian Muslim immigration continued throughout the following decades and increased after Austria-Hungary formally annexed Bosnia in 1908. To this day, Bushnak remains a common surname among Palestinians of Bosnian origin.

The number of Bedouins who started settling the Negev region from the 7th century considerably increased during Ottoman rule as a result of immigration of both Bedouin tribes from south and east and peasant farmers (fellahins) from Egypt. The Egyptian fellahins settled mostly in the region around Gaza and received protection from Bedouins, in return for goods. Bedouins brought African slaves (abid) from Sudan who worked for them. To reduce frictions and to stabilize the boundaries between Bedouin tribes, the Ottomans established an administrative center in Beersheba around 1900, as the first planned settlement in Negev since the Nabatean and Byzantine times. In the beginning of the 20th century, most of the population of Hebron were descendants of Bedouins who migrated to Palestine from Transjordan in the 15th and 16th century. According to the 1922 census of Palestine, "The Ottoman authorities in 1914 placed the tribal population of Beersheba at 55,000, and since that date there has been a migration of tribes from the Hejaz and Southern Transjordan into the Beersheba area mainly as a result of succession of adequate rainfalls and of pressure exerted by other tribes east of the River Jordan." For 1922, the census gives a figure of 74,910 including 72,998 in the tribal areas.

Demographer Uziel Schmelz, in his analysis of Ottoman registration data for 1905 populations of Jerusalem and Hebron kazas, found that most Ottoman citizens living in these areas, comprising about one quarter of the population of Palestine, were living at the place where they were born. Specifically, of Muslims, 93.1% were born in their current locality of residence, 5.2% were born elsewhere in Palestine, and 1.6% were born outside Palestine. Of Christians, 93.4% were born in their current locality, 3.0% were born elsewhere in Palestine, and 3.6% were born outside Palestine. Of Jews (excluding the large fraction who were not Ottoman citizens), 59.0% were born in their current locality, 1.9% were born elsewhere in Palestine, and 39.0% were born outside Palestine.

British Mandate period, 1919–1948

According to Roberto Bachi, head of the Israeli Institute of  Statistics from 1949 onwards, between 1922 and 1945 there was a net Arab migration into Palestine of between 40,000 and 42,000, excluding 9,700 people who were incorporated after territorial adjustments were made to the borders in the 1920s. Based on these figures, and including those netted by the border alterations, Joseph Melzer  calculates an upper boundary of 8.5% for Arab growth in the two decades, and interprets it to mean the local Palestinian community's growth was generated primarily by natural increase.

According to a Jewish Agency survey, 77% of Arab population growth in Palestine between 1914 and 1938, during which the Arab population doubled, was due to natural increase, while 23% was due to immigration. Arab immigration was primarily from Lebanon, Syria, Transjordan, and Egypt (all countries that bordered Palestine).

The overall assessment of several British reports was that the increase in the Arab population was primarily due to natural increase. These included the Hope Simpson Enquiry (1930), the Passfield White Paper (1930), the Peel Commission report (1937), and the Survey of Palestine (1945). However, the Hope Simpson Enquiry did note that there was significant illegal immigration from the surrounding Arab territories, while the Peel Commission and Survey of Palestine claimed that immigration played only a minor role in the growth of the Arab population. The 1931 census of Palestine considered the question of illegal immigration since the previous census in 1922. It estimated that unrecorded immigration during that period may have amounted to 9,000 Jews and 4,000 Arabs. It also gave the proportion of persons living in Palestine in 1931 who were born outside Palestine: Muslims, 2%; Christians, 20%; Jews, 58%. The statistical information for Arab immigration (and expulsions when the clandestine migrants were caught), with a contrast to the figures for Jewish immigration over the same period of 1936–1939, is given by Henry Laurens in the following terms 

Palestinian immigration 1936-1939
{| class="wikitable"
|-
! Jews !! Arabs 
|-
| rowspan=1 | 69,716 ||2,267
|-
|}
Expulsions of illegals, 1937-1938
{| class="wikitable"
|-
! Jews !! Arabs (et al.).
|-
| rowspan=1 | 125  ||1,704
|-
|}

According to Mark Tessler, at least some of the Arab population growth was the result of immigration, mostly from the Sinai, Lebanon, Syria, and Transjordan, stimulated by the relatively favorable economic conditions in Palestine, but he noted differing opinions among scholars over how substantial it was. He cited one study as putting the Arab population growth attributable to immigration between 1922 and 1931 at 7%, meaning that 4% of the Arab population in 1931 was foreign-born, while noting another estimate put the growth in the Arab population attributable to immigration at 38.7%, which would mean that 11.8% of the Arab population in 1931 was foreign-born. Tessler wrote that "Israeli as well as Palestinian scholars have disputed this assertion, however, concluding that it is at best a theory and in all probability a myth."
 
In a 1974 study, demographer Roberto Bachi estimated that about 900 Muslims per year were detected as illegal immigrants but not deported. He noted the impossibility of estimating illegal immigration that was undetected, or the fraction of those persons who eventually departed. He did note that there was an unexplained increase in the Muslim population between 1922 and 1931, and he did suggest, though qualifying it as a "mere guess", that this was due to a combination of unrecorded immigration (using the 1931 census report estimate) and undercounting in the 1922 census.

While noting the uncertainty of earlier data, Bachi also observed that the Muslim population growth in the 19th century appeared to be high by world standards:
"[B]etween 1800 and 1914, the Muslim population had a yearly average increase of an order of magnitude of roughly 6–7 per thousand. This can be compared to the very crude estimate of about 4 per thousand for the "less developed countries" of the world (in Asia, Africa, and Latin America) between 1800 and 1910. It is possible that some part of the growth of the Muslim population was due to immigration. However, it seems likely that the dominant determinant of this modest growth was the beginning of some natural increase."

According to Justin McCarthy, "... evidence for Muslim immigration into Palestine is minimal. Because no Ottoman records of that immigration have yet been discovered, one is thrown back on demographic analysis to evaluate Muslim migration." McCarthy argues that there is no significant Arab immigration into mandatory Palestine:
From analyses of rates of increase of the Muslim population of the three Palestinian sanjaks, one can say with certainty that Muslim immigration after the 1870s was small. Had there been a large group of Muslim immigrants their numbers would have caused an unusual increase in the population and this would have appeared in the calculated rate of increase from one registration list to another... Such an increase would have been easily noticed; it was not there.
The argument that Arab immigration somehow made up a large part of the Palestinian Arab population is thus statistically untenable. The vast majority of the Palestinian Arabs resident in 1947 were the sons and daughters of Arabs who were living in Palestine before modern Jewish immigration began. There is no reason to believe that they were not the sons and daughters of Arabs who had been in Palestine for many centuries.
McCarthy also concludes that there was no significant internal migration to Jewish areas attributable to better economic conditions:
Some areas of Palestine did experience greater population growth than others, but the explanation for this is simple. Radical economic change was occurring all over the Mediterranean Basin at the time. Improved transportation, greater mercantile activity, and greater industry had increased the chances for employment in cities, especially coastal cities... Differential population increase was occurring all over the Eastern Mediterranean, not just in Palestine... The increase in Muslim population had little or nothing to do with Jewish immigration. In fact the province that experienced the greatest Jewish population growth (by .035 annually), Jerusalem Sanjak, was the province with the lowest rate of growth of Muslim population (.009).Fred M. Gottheil has questioned McCarthy's estimates of immigration. Gottheil says that McCarthy didn't give proper weight to the importance of economic incentives at the time, and that McCarthy cites Roberto Bachi's estimates as conclusive numbers, rather than lower bounds based on detected illegal immigration.

Gad Gilbar has also concluded that the prosperity of Palestine in the 45–50 years before World War I was a result of the modernization and growth of the economy owing to its integration with the world economy and especially with the economies of Europe. Although the reasons for growth were exogenous to Palestine the bearers were not waves of Jewish immigration, foreign intervention nor Ottoman reforms but "primarily local Arab Muslims and Christians." However, Gilbar did attribute the rapid growth of Jaffa and Haifa in the final three decades of Ottoman rule in part to migration, writing that "both attracted population from the rural and urban surroundings and immigrants from outside Palestine."

Yehoshua Porath believes that the notion of "large-scale immigration of Arabs from the neighboring countries" is a myth "proposed by Zionist writers". He writes:
As all the research by historian Fares Abdul Rahim and geographers of modern Palestine shows, the Arab population began to grow again in the middle of the nineteenth century. That growth resulted from a new factor: the demographic revolution. Until the 1850s there was no "natural" increase of the population, but this began to change when modern medical treatment was introduced and modern hospitals were established, both by the Ottoman authorities and by the foreign Christian missionaries. The number of births remained steady but infant mortality decreased. This was the main reason for Arab population growth. ... No one would doubt that some migrant workers came to Palestine from Syria and Trans-Jordan and remained there. But one has to add to this that there were migrations in the opposite direction as well. For example, a tradition developed in Hebron to go to study and work in Cairo, with the result that a permanent community of Hebronites had been living in Cairo since the fifteenth century. Trans-Jordan exported unskilled casual labor to Palestine; but before 1948 its civil service attracted a good many educated Palestinian Arabs who did not find work in Palestine itself. Demographically speaking, however, neither movement of population was significant in comparison to the decisive factor of natural increase.
Daniel Pipes responded to Porath by granting that From Time Immemorial quoted carelessly, used statistics sloppily, and ignored inconvenient facts. Nonetheless, he explained that:Miss Peters's central thesis is that a substantial immigration of Arabs to Palestine took place during the first half of the twentieth century. She supports this argument with an array of demographic statistics and contemporary accounts, the bulk of which have not been questioned by any reviewer, including Porath.Porath replied with an array of demographic data to support his position. He also wrote that Peters's demographic statistics were inexplicable: ...nowhere in her main text or in the methodological appendices (V and VI) did Mrs. Peters bother to explain to her readers how she managed to break down the Ottoman or Cuinet's figures into smaller units than subdistricts. As far as I know no figures for the units smaller than subdistricts (Nahia; the parallel of the French commune), covering the area of Ottoman Palestine, were ever published. Therefore I can't avoid the conclusion that Mrs. Peters's figures were, at best, based on guesswork and an extremely tendentious guesswork at that.

Modern era

, Israeli and Palestinian statistics for the overall numbers of Jews and Arabs in the area west of the Jordan, inclusive of Israel and the Palestinian territories, are similar and suggest a rough parity in the two populations. Palestinian statistics estimate 6.1 million Palestinians for that area, while Israel's Central Bureau of Statistics estimates 6.2 million Jews living in sovereign Israel. Gaza is estimated by the Israeli Defense Forces (IDF) to have 1.7 million, and the West Bank 2.8 million Palestinians, while Israel proper has 1.7 million Arab citizens. According to Israel's Central Bureau of Statistics, as of May 2006, of Israel's 7 million people, 77% were Jews, 18.5% Arabs, and 4.3% "others". Among Jews, 68% were Sabras (Israeli-born), mostly second- or third-generation Israelis, and the rest are olim – 22% from Europe and the Americas, and 10% from Asia and Africa, including the Arab countries.

According to these Israeli and Palestinian estimates, the population in Israel and the Palestinian territories stands at from 6.1 to 6.2 million Palestinians  and 6.1 million Jews. According to Sergio DellaPergola, if foreign workers and non-Jewish Russian immigrants in Israel are subtracted, Jews are already a minority in the land between the river and the sea. DellaPergola calculates that Palestinians as of January 2014 number 5.7 million as opposed to a "core Jewish population" of 6.1 million.

The Palestinian statistics are contested by some right-wing Israeli think-tanks and non-demographers such as Yoram Ettinger, who claim they overestimate Palestinian numbers by double-counting and counting Palestinians who live abroad. The double-counting  argument is dismissed by both Arnon Soffer, Ian Lustick and DellaPergola, the latter dismissing Ettinger's calculations as 'delusional' or manipulated for ignoring the birth-rate differentials between the two populations (3 children per Jewish mother vs 3.4 for Palestinians generally, and 4.1 in the Gaza Strip). DellaPergola allows, however, for an inflation in the Palestinian statistics due to the counting of Palestinians who are abroad, a discrepancy of some 380,000 individuals.

Demographics of the State of Israel
The latest Israeli census was conducted by Israel Central Bureau of Statistics in 2019. Israeli census excludes the Gaza Strip. It also excludes all West Bank Palestinian localities, including those in Area C, while it includes the annexed East Jerusalem. It also includes all Israeli settlements in the West Bank. The census also includes the occupied Syrian territory of Golan Heights.

As per this census, the total population in 2019 was 9,140,473. Israeli population consists of 7,221,442 "Jews and others", and 1,919,031 Arabs, almost all of which Palestinians, with 26,261 in Golan Subdistrict, being Syrian, mostly Druze, and a small number Alawite. The population includes the Druze community of Israel (i.e. not Syrian Druze) as well, who generally self-identify as Israeli, and are the only Arab-speaking community that has mandatory military service in the IDF.

Demographics of the State of Palestine

The latest Palestinian Census was conducted by Palestinian Central Bureau of Statistics in 2017. The Palestinian census covers the Gaza Strip and the West Bank, including East Jerusalem. The Palestinian census does not cover Israeli settlements in the West Bank including those in East Jerusalem. The census does not provide any ethnic or religious distinction. However, it is reasonable to assume that almost everyone counted is Palestinian Arab.

As per this census, the total population of the Palestinian territories was 4,780,978. The West Bank had a population of 2,881,687, whereas the Gaza Strip had a population of 1,899,291.

Combined demographics

The combined population of the territory of Historic Palestine in 2019, including the occupied Golan Heights, was 14,121,893. This is based upon an estimation of a population  of 13,868,091 in Israel, the West Bank and Gaza Strip, assuming a growth rate of 2.5% in the Palestinian territories, as estimated by the World Bank. Since the Palestinian Arab population of East Jerusalem was counted in both censuses, the more recent and more accurate number from Israel Central Bureau of Statistics was chosen. (East Jerusalem is under Israeli jurisdiction and the Palestinian Central Bureau of Statistics doesn't have access to the territory, and thus its count would be less reliable.)

See also
Muslim history in Palestine
Islamization of Jerusalem
History of the Jewish community in Palestine
Aliyah
History of Christianity in Palestine
Christian emigration
History of Palestine
Genetic history of the Middle East
Travelogues of Ottoman Palestine - for early travellers commenting on demographics
Demographic history of Jerusalem
Samaritan culture and history
Demographics of Israel
Demographics of the Palestinian territories

Notes

References

Further reading

 Forbes, Andrew, and Henley, David, People of Palestine (Chiang Mai: Cognoscenti Books, 2012), ASIN: B0094TU8VY

History of Palestine (region)
Palestine
Palestine
Palestine